XDOS may refer to:

 Cromemco XDOS, a diagnostic and bootstrap program for the Cromemco XXU.
 Pat Villani's XDOS, an early predecessor to NSS-DOS, DOS/NT, DOS-C and the FreeDOS kernel
 XML denial-of-service attack

See also 
DOS (disambiguation)
XOS (disambiguation)